Robert John Greig (1887 – 27 April 1955) was an Australian politician for the Labor Party. He represented the Electoral district of Drummoyne 1941–1947. He served alongside Thomas Bavin in the Electoral district of Ryde 1920–27.

References

1887 births
1955 deaths
Members of the New South Wales Legislative Assembly
Australian Labor Party members of the Parliament of New South Wales
20th-century Australian politicians